SentinelOne, Inc. is an American cybersecurity company listed on NYSE based in Mountain View, California. The company was founded in 2013 by Tomer Weingarten, Almog Cohen and Ehud ("Udi") Shamir. Weingarten acts as the company's CEO. Nicholas Warner is the company's COO. The company has approximately 970 employees and offices in Mountain View, Boston, Tokyo, and Berlin. The company uses machine learning for monitoring personal computers, IoT devices, and cloud workloads. The company's platform utilizes a heuristic model, specifically its patented behavioral AI. The company is AV-TEST certified.

Funding
In June 2019, SentinelOne received $120 million in a Series D funding round led by Insight Partners. The company received an addition $200 million in Series E funding in February 2020. The Series E round placed SentinelOne at a valuation of about $1.1 billion. In 2020, SentinelOne closed a round for $267 million in funding, bringing their total valuation to $3.1 billion.

On June 30, 2021, SentinelOne completed an initial public offering on the NYSE, raising $1.2 billion.

Acquisitions
In February 2021, SentinelOne announced the acquisition of cloud-scale data analytics platform Scalyr for $155 million in cash and equity.

In March 2022, SentinelOne announced the acquisition of the identity detection and response technology company, Attivo Networks, for $616.5 million in cash and equity.

Sponsorships 
Since 2021, SentinelOne has been the official cybersecurity sponsor of Aston Martin Cognizant F1 Team.

References

External links
 

Software companies established in 2011
Computer security companies
Companies based in Mountain View, California
American companies established in 2013
2013 establishments in California
2021 initial public offerings
Companies listed on the New York Stock Exchange
Software companies of the United States